Pyotr Aleksandrovich Marshinskiy (born 17 February 1986) is a former Russian professional footballer.

Club career
He made his debut for FC Moscow on 11 August 2005 in a Russian Cup game against FC Dynamo Makhachkala. He made his next appearance on 2 July 2006 in the next season's Russian Cup game against FC Terek Grozny, FC Moscow eventually reached the final.

Personal life
His brother Aleksei Marshinskiy is also a professional footballer.

Honours
 Russian Cup finalist: 2007.

External links
 

1986 births
Living people
Russian footballers
Association football defenders
FC Moscow players
FC Daugava players
Latvian Higher League players
Russian expatriate footballers
Expatriate footballers in Latvia
Russian expatriate sportspeople in Latvia